Mark Retera (born 16 May 1964, Eindhoven) is a Dutch cartoonist, best known for his absurd gag comic DirkJan. He is the winner of the 2004 Stripschapprijs. He also draws caricatures for the Dutch weekly Panorama.

Retera studied cognitive science at the current Radboud University Nijmegen before turning full-time artist.

References

1964 births
Living people
Dutch cartoonists
Dutch caricaturists
Dutch comics artists
Dutch surrealist artists
Radboud University Nijmegen alumni
People from Eindhoven
Winners of the Stripschapsprijs